The Loving Women (Spanish: Las cariñosas) is a 1953 Mexican comedy film directed by Fernando Cortés and starring Amalia Aguilar, Lilia del Valle and Silvia Pinal.

Cast

References

Bibliography 
 María Luisa Amador. Cartelera cinematográfica, 1950-1959. UNAM, 1985.

External links 
 

1953 films
1953 comedy films
Mexican comedy films
1950s Spanish-language films
Films directed by Fernando Cortés
Mexican black-and-white films
1950s Mexican films